Antonio Manuel Maria Coelho  (1857–1943) was a Portuguese military officer of the Portuguese Army and politician during the period of the Portuguese First Republic. In January 1891, he had been one of the leading revolutionaries during the Porto republican revolt. Among other posts, he served as governor of Portuguese Angola and governor of Portuguese Guinea. He became Prime Minister after the Noite Sangrenta (Bloody Night) terrorist assassinations of prominent state figures (including Prime Minister António Granjo) on 19 October 1921. A Freemason (like many of his colleagues), he was co-author, along with João Chagas, of the work História da Revolta do Porto (History of the Porto Revolt).

References

1857 births
1943 deaths
People from Chaves, Portugal
Prime Ministers of Portugal
Portuguese military officers
Governors of Portuguese Guinea
Colonial people in Angola
19th-century Portuguese people
Governors of Portuguese Angola